Tashkent District is a district of Tashkent Region in Uzbekistan. The seat lies at the city Keles. It was first created in 1975, merged into Zangiota District in 2010, and re-established in 2017.

The district consists of one city (Keles), 9 urban-type settlements (Z.Jalilov, Koʻk saroy, Kensoy, Sabzavot, M.Fozilov, Shamsiobod, Chigʻatoy, Hasanboy, Qashqarlik) and 9 rural communities.

References

Tashkent Region
Districts of Uzbekistan